Agramonte is a Cuban village and consejo popular ("people's council", i.e. hamlet) of the municipality of Jagüey Grande, Matanzas Province. With a population of 10,502 it is the most populated village in the municipality after Jagüey.

History
Founded in 1859 with the name of Cuevitas, it was renamed after Ignacio Agramonte, a Cuban revolutionary and patriot during the Ten Years' War (1868-1878). Until the 1976 reform, Agramonte was an autonomous municipality that extended in the northern area of the municipal territory of Jagüey Grande.

Geography
Agramonte is located in the middle of an agricultural plain, between Perico and Jagüey Grande (both 17 km far). It is 20 km far from Jovellanos, 25 from Colón, 28 from Pedro Betancourt, 38 from Calimete and 72 from Matanzas.

Transport
The village is crossed in the middle by the Road 222 Jagüey-Perico, and is 20 km in the north of A1 motorway. It counts a railway station on the Havana-Güines-Aguada-Cienfuegos line that is also served by a regional service from Matanzas.

See also
Australia (village)
Antonio Ramon Horta AG7
List of cities in Cuba
Municipalities of Cuba

References

External links

Populated places in Matanzas Province
Jagüey Grande